The Fifth Dynasty of ancient Egypt (notated Dynasty V) is often combined with Dynasties III, IV and VI under the group title the Old Kingdom. The Fifth Dynasty pharaohs reigned for approximately 150 years, from the early 25th century BC until the mid 24th century BC.

Chronology
The Fifth Dynasty of Egypt is a group of nine kings ruling Egypt for approximately 150 years in the 25th and 24th centuries BC. The relative succession of kings is not entirely secured as there are contradictions between historical sources and archaeological evidence regarding the reign of the shadowy Shepseskare.

Rulers 
Known rulers in the Fifth Dynasty are listed below. Manetho assigns 248 years of rule to the Fifth Dynasty; however, the pharaohs of this dynasty more probably ruled for approximately 150 years. This estimate varies by both scholar and source. The Horus names and most names of the queens are taken from Dodson and Hilton.

Manetho writes that the Dynasty V kings ruled from Elephantine, but archeologists have found evidence clearly showing that their palaces were still located at Ineb-hedj ("White Walls").

As before, expeditions were sent to Wadi Maghareh and Wadi Kharit in the Sinai to mine for turquoise and copper, and to quarries northwest of Abu Simbel for gneiss. Trade expeditions were sent south to Punt to obtain malachite, myrrh, and electrum, and archeological finds at Byblos attest to diplomatic expeditions sent to that Phoenician city. Finds bearing the names of several Dynasty V kings at the site of Dorak, near the Sea of Marmara, may be evidence of trade but remain a mystery.

Userkaf 
How Pharaoh Userkaf founded this dynasty is not known for certain. The Westcar Papyrus, which was written during the Middle Kingdom, tells a story of how king Khufu of Dynasty IV was given a prophecy that triplets born to the wife of the priest of Ra in Sakhbu would overthrow him and his heirs, and how he attempted to put these children – named Userkaf, Sahure, and Neferirkare – to death; however in recent years, scholars have recognized this story to be at best a legend and admit their ignorance over how the transition from one dynasty to another transpired.

During this dynasty, Egyptian religion made several important changes. The earliest known copies of funerary prayers inscribed on royal tombs (known as the Pyramid Texts) appear. The cult of the god Ra gains added importance, and kings from Userkaf through Menkauhor Kaiu built temples dedicated to Ra at or near Abusir. Then late in this dynasty, the cult of the deity Osiris assumes importance, most notably in the inscriptions found in the tomb of Unas.

Djedkare Isesi 
Amongst non-royal Egyptians of this time, Ptahhotep, vizier to Djedkare Isesi, won fame for his wisdom; The Maxims of Ptahhotep was ascribed to him by its later copyists. Non-royal tombs were also decorated with inscriptions, like the royal ones, but instead of prayers or incantations, biographies of the deceased were written on the walls.

Notes

References

Bibliography

 
States and territories established in the 3rd millennium BC
States and territories disestablished in the 3rd millennium BC
05
3rd millennium BC in Egypt
3rd-millennium BC establishments in Egypt
3rd-millennium BC disestablishments in Egypt